Francisco Bulanti (born 12 April 1980) is a Uruguayan rugby union player. He was named in Uruguay's squad for the 2015 Rugby World Cup.

References

1980 births
Living people
Uruguayan rugby union players
Uruguay international rugby union players
Place of birth missing (living people)
Rugby union wings